Charles Thomas Sean Mayes (17 March 1945 – 12 July 1995) was a British pianist and writer.

Born in Stone Allerton, Somerset, Mayes was schooled in Bristol. He won a place at Trinity College, Cambridge, where he obtained a degree in philosophy.

Mayes played in a rock and roll band called Fumble, which supported David Bowie on the Ziggy Stardust Tour in 1972. He made three albums with Fumble, and featured in the original cast of Elvis! at the Astoria Theatre.

In 1978, Mayes played for Bowie on the Isolar II Tour, recorded and released on the live album Stage, and on Lodger, released in 1979. In 1983 he joined Tom Robinson for "War Baby" and further album tracks.

He wrote a biography of Joan Armatrading and co-wrote a visual documentary about Kate Bush with Kevin Cann.
He also wrote the book Life on Tour with David Bowie: We Can Be Heroes, which was published in 1999, four years after his death.

Mayes died in London on 12 July 1995, at the age of 50.

Bibliography
Kate Bush – a visual documentary (Kevin Cann & Sean Mayes) (1988) Omnibus Press  
Joan Armatrading – A Biography (1990) Weidenfeld and Nicolson 
We Can Be Heroes – Life on Tour with David Bowie (1999) Independent Music Press

References

External links
 Fumble Band members: Sean Mayes

1945 births
1995 deaths
English rock pianists
20th-century pianists
Alumni of Trinity College, Cambridge